Tomaž Pandur (19 February 1963 – 12 April 2016) was a Slovenian theatre director.

Career as a director

In Slovenia
As a student of Maribor Grammar School No. 1 he established his own theatre group "Tespisov voz – Novo slovensko gledališče". He graduated on AGRTF in 1988. His Scheherazade (1988) was a sensation. In 1989 he became art director of the Drama section of the Maribor Slovene National Theatre. During this time his productions of Hamlet, Faust, Carmen, and Divine Comedy has put it on the top of contemporary Slovenian director in theatre.

International

Personal life

Because of the rumours regarding his financial matters, he left Slovenia and moved to New York City, US, where he was living until 1990. In the last years of his life he lived and worked in Madrid, Spain.

References

External links
 Home page
 Tomaž Pandur – SiGledal 
 Oder, oddaja o sočasnem gledališču (July 29, 2011) 
 Tomaž Pandur: Umetnik s podjetniško žilico ali podjetnik z umetniško (April 5, 2014) 
 Tomaž Pandur Intervju (December 28, 2014) 

1963 births
2016 deaths
Slovenian theatre directors
People from Maribor